La Comedia Dinner Theatre is located in Springboro, Ohio. La Comedia is one of the nation's oldest and largest professional dinner theaters with Broadway-style productions. Having entertained over six million guests, 2021 marks the 47th season.  The theatre produces between 6 and 9 productions each year and also hosts music groups for short gigs.  Guests are first served dinner buffet style and the show follows.  Each production plays for about 6 to 8 weeks.

La Comedia opened January 28, 1975 with the production of 'A Funny Thing Happened on  the Way to the Forum' under the direction of E.Mac Vestal, Jr.  One of the first advertisements for the dinner theatre announced an "Exciting dinner and a Live Professional Broadway Stage Play", "both for only $6.65".  At age 27, Joe and Marilyn Mitchell were the original producers and owners of La Comedia Dinner Theatre until they sold the establishment in 1987.

See also
 List of dinner theaters

References

External links 
 La Comedia Dinner Theatre website 
 Warren County Convention & Visitors Bureau

Categories

Theatres in Cincinnati
Dinner theatre
Tourist attractions in Warren County, Ohio